The Tbilisi Sakrebulo is a representative body in the city government of Tbilisi, Georgia.  It is also known in English as the Tbilisi City Council or Tbilisi Assembly.  
Sakrebulos were established as the legislative branch of local government not only in Tbilisi, but throughout Georgia, by reforms instituted in 1991 as the country declared independence from the Soviet Union.

Composition

The members of the Sakrebulo are selected through a mixed electoral system. Of the 50 seats, 40 are filled through direct elections in local districts of the city. The remaining 10 members are chosen by political parties and are apportioned according to their support citywide. From 2021 assembly has 29 members from the ruling Georgian Dream, 13 from the United National Movement, 4 from For Georgia, 2 from Lelo, 1 from Girchi - More Freedom and 1 from For the People.

Powers

In accordance with the Code of Local Self-Government of the Organic Law of Georgia, the Sakrebulo exercises its powers to define the administrative-territorial organization of the municipality and its identity, organizational activities, determination of the personnel policy of the municipality, regulation and control of the activities of executive bodies; In the fields of municipal property management, social, amenities and household utilities, land use and natural resources use, municipal territory planning, transport and road economy, accounting, support for innovative development and informatization.

The authority of the Sakrebulo in the field of administrative-territorial organization of the municipality and defining its identity includes:
 Creation and abolition of administrative units in the municipality, change of their borders
 Establishment of local self-government symbols - coat of arms, flag and other symbols and make changes in them
 establish the rules for the introduction of honorary titles and awards of the self-governing unit and their award
 names of geographical objects, Establishing the rule of numbering of buildings in the settlements
 Making a decision on creating, joining or leaving a non-profit (non-commercial) legal entity together with other self-governing units.
 approval of the socio-economic development strategy of the self-governing unit
 approval of measures and programs to be taken to attract investments and support innovative development in the territory of the municipality

Election results

The most recent city council election was held on October 2, 2021, and the results were as follows:

! colspan=2| Party
! Lead candidate
! Votes
! %
! +/–
! Seats
! +/–
|-
| bgcolor= |
| align=left| Georgian Dream
| align=left| Levan Zhorzholiani
| 193 486
| 40.39
|  12.75
| 29
|  10
|-
| bgcolor=#e4012e| 
| align=left| National Movement 
| align=left| Sophio Japaridze
| 133 926
| 27.96
|  10.30
| 13
|  8
|-
| bgcolor=#702F92| 
| align=left| For Georgia 
| align=left| Levan Dolidze
| 42 596
| 8.89
| New
| 4
| New
|-
| bgcolor=#fad406| 
| align=left| Lelo
| align=left| Badri Japaridze
| 17 373
| 3.63
| New
| 2
| New
|-
| bgcolor=#327F37| 
| align=left| Girchi - More Freedom
| align=left| Tengiz Kirtadze
| 15 799
| 3.29
| New
| 1
| New
|-
| bgcolor=#F2721D| 
| align=left|For the People
| align=left| Alexander Ratishvili
| 12 337
| 2.58
| New
| 1
| New
|-
| colspan=8 bgcolor=lightgrey| 
|-
| bgcolor=#8bc53e| 
| align=left| Citizens
| align=left| Fatman Barjadze
| 11 743
| 2.45
| New
| 0
| New
|-
| bgcolor=#ff0000| 
| align=left| Droa
| align=left| Elene Khoshtaria
| 10 262
| 2.14
| New
| 0
| New
|-
|-
| bgcolor=#e7b031| 
| align=left| Alliance of Patriots
| align=left| Gocha Tevdoradze
| 7 915
| 1.65
|  3.97
| 0
|  2
|-
| bgcolor=| 
| align=left|New Political Center - Girchi
| align=left| Herman Sabo
| 7 695
| 1.61
| New
| 0
| New
|-
| bgcolor=| 
| align=left| Labour Party
| align=left| Lasha Chkhartishvili
| 6 293
| 1.31
|  2.59
| 0
| 
|-
| bgcolor=#003C7B| 
| align=left| European Georgia
| align=left| Giorgi Noniashvili
| 5 575
| 1.16
|  8.02
| 0
|  3
|-
| bgcolor=#ff0000| 
| align=left| Strategy Aghmashenebeli
| align=left| Sergo Chikhladze
| 4 817
| 1.01
|  2.43
| 0
| 
|-
| bgcolor=#D3D3D3| 
| align=left| Other
| 
| 9 133
| 1.91
| 
| 
| 
|-
! colspan=3| Total
! 
! 
! 
! 50
! ±
|-
! colspan=3| Electorate/voter turnout
! 
!  
! 
! 
! 
|-
| colspan=8| Source: 
|}

Previous election results

2017

! colspan=2| Party
! Votes
! %
! Seats
|-
| bgcolor=| 
| align=left| Georgian Dream
| 205,994
| 53.15
| 39
|-
| bgcolor= #e4012e| 
| align=left| National Movement 
| 68,432
| 17.66
| 5
|-
| bgcolor= #003876| 
| align=left| European Georgia
| 35,586
| 9.18
| 3
|-
| bgcolor= #e7b031| 
| align=left| Alliance of Patriots
| 21,775
| 5.62
| 2
|-
| colspan=5 bgcolor=lightgrey| 
|-
| bgcolor=| 
| align=left| Labour Party
| 15,112
| 3.90
| 0
|-
| bgcolor= #ff0000| 
| align=left| Strategy Aghmashenebeli
| 13,350
| 3.44
| 0
|-
| bgcolor= #004a99| 
| align=left| Democratic Movement
| 12,321
| 3.18
| 0
|-
| bgcolor= #F6741E| 
| align=left| Republican Party
| 6,229
| 1.61
| 0
|-
! colspan=1| Total
!
! 411,847
! 100.0
! 50 
|-
| colspan=5| Source:  
|}

2014

2010

2006

2002

1998

Notes

See also 
 Local government in Georgia (country)

References

External links
Tbilisi Sakrebulo official web site
Sakrebulo information on the official Tbilisi web site

Government of Tbilisi
City assemblies in Georgia (country)

ka:თბილისის თვითმმართველობა#მერია